This is a list of games in the 2017 version of British game show The Crystal Maze, sorted by zone.

The coloured backgrounds denote the type of game:
 - Mental
 - Mystery
 - Physical
 - Skill

ALIS - Automatic Lock-in Situation

Aztec Zone

Futuristic Zone

Industrial Zone

Medieval Zone

Eastern Zone

References

Lists of British television series episodes